Mona Pretorius (born 12 August 1988) is a South African weightlifter. She competed in the women's 63 kg event at the 2018 Commonwealth Games, winning the bronze medal.

She currently has her own Olympic Weightlifting coaching business which can be found on Lift Big Eat Big.

References

External links
 

1988 births
Living people
South African female weightlifters
Place of birth missing (living people)
Weightlifters at the 2018 Commonwealth Games
Commonwealth Games bronze medallists for South Africa
Commonwealth Games medallists in weightlifting
Competitors at the 2019 African Games
African Games competitors for South Africa
20th-century South African women
21st-century South African women
Medallists at the 2018 Commonwealth Games